Robert Andrews (born c. 1763; died 13 November 1821, at age 58) was the Resident and Superintendent of British Ceylon.  He was appointed on 12 February 1796 and was Resident until 12 October 1798.  He was succeeded by Frederick North as Governor of British Ceylon.

Andrews was in the East India Company, in the Madras Civil Service, from 1778, and became Collector of Trinchinopoli. He was Senior Judge of Appeal, in the Madras Presidency.

References 

1760s births
1821 deaths
Year of birth uncertain
Governors of British Ceylon
British East India Company civil servants
British expatriates in Sri Lanka
19th-century British people